Henry Clay Work (October 1, 1832 – June 8, 1884) was an American composer and songwriter known for the songs Kingdom Coming, Marching Through Georgia, The Ship That Never Returned and My Grandfather's Clock.

Early life and education
Work was born in Middletown, Connecticut, to Alanson and Aurelia (née Forbes) Work. His father opposed slavery, and Work was himself an active abolitionist and Union supporter. His family's home became a stop on the Underground Railroad, assisting runaway slaves to freedom in Canada, for which his father was once imprisoned.

Work was self-taught in music. By the time he was 23, he worked as a printer in Chicago, specializing in setting musical type. He allegedly composed in his head as he worked, without a piano, using the noise of the machinery as an inspiration. His first published song was "We Are Coming, Sister Mary", which eventually became a staple in Christy's Minstrels shows.

Career

Work produced much of his best material during the Civil War. He captured the deeply-felt emotions of that conflict and was more popular even than Stephen Foster. Work shares much of the credit for the development of the carefully refined Verse-Chorus structure of late 19th century popular song. In 1862 he published "Kingdom Coming" using his own lyrics based upon snippets of Negro speech he had heard. This use of slave dialect (Irish too was a favourite) tended to limit the appeal of Work's works and make them frowned upon today. However, "Kingdom Coming" appeared in the Jerome Kern show "Good Morning, Dearie" on Broadway in 1921, and was heard in the background in the 1944 Judy Garland film "Meet Me in St. Louis". 1862 also saw his novelty song "Grafted Into the Army", followed in 1863 by "Babylon is Fallen" ("Don't you see the black clouds risin' ober yonder"), "The Song of a Thousand Years", and "God Save the Nation".  His 1864 effort "Wake Nicodemus" was popular in minstrel shows.

In 1865 he wrote his greatest hit, "Marching Through Georgia", inspired by Sherman's march to the sea  at the end of the previous year. Thanks to its lively melody, the song was immensely popular, its million sheet-music sales being unprecedented.  It is a cheerful marching song and has since been pressed into service many times, including by Princeton University as a football fight song.  Timothy Shay Arthur's play Ten Nights in a Barroom, had Work's 1864 "Come Home, Father", a dirgesome song bemoaning the demon drink:  too mawkish for modern tastes, but always sung at Temperance Meetings.

An unhappy marriage seems to have affected his postwar output. Settling into sentimental balladry, Work had significant post-Civil War success with "The Lost Letter", and "The Ship That Never Returned"—a tune reused in the "Wreck of the Old 97" and "MTA".  A massive hit was "My Grandfather's Clock", published in 1876, which was introduced by Sam Lucas in Hartford, Connecticut, and again secured more than a million sales of the sheet music, along with popularizing the phrase "grandfather clock" to describe a longcase clock."

By 1880 Work was living in New York City, giving his occupation as a musician. He died in Hartford two years later at the age of 51. He was survived by his wife, Sarah Parker Work, and one of their four children.

Henry Clay Work was inducted into the Songwriters Hall of Fame in 1970. He was a distant cousin to Frances Work, a great-grandmother of Diana, Princess of Wales.

Songs

Among the best-known of Henry Clay Work's 75 compositions are:
"Kingdom Coming" (c. 1863)
"Come Home, Father"  (1864)
"Wake Nicodemus" (1864)
"Marching Through Georgia"  (1865)
"The Ship That Never Returned"  (1868)
"Crossing the Grand Sierras"  (1870)
"My Grandfather's Clock"  (1876)

References

External links

 The Music of Henry Work
 
 
 Henry Clay Work Find A Grave memorial
 
 Representative Poetry On-line - "Selected Poetry of Henry Clay Work"
 His page on HierarchyPedia

1832 births
1884 deaths
American male composers
American lyricists
Songwriters from Connecticut
People of the American Civil War
Underground Railroad people
19th-century American composers
Songwriters from New York (state)
19th-century American male musicians
American male songwriters